"Tudo Pode Mudar" (Portuguese for "Everything Can Change") is a song from the Metrô album Olhar. It was written by the gaúcho singer Joe Euthanazia (in his second collaboration with Metrô, the first one being "Johnny Love") with Ronaldo Santos, and released as a B-side to the single "Ti Ti Ti". It is one of the band's most memorable hits thanks to the massive airplay it received at the time of its release, making it the second most played song on Brazilian radios in 1985 after "We Are the World". A music video for the song, directed by Eid Walesko, was released in the same year.

Euthanazia himself covered the song on his only release Joe, which was released in 1989. Further cover versions were made by Eliana (in her 2004 album Diga Sim) and, more recently, by Jullie.

Jullie cover version

Jullie's version of the song was originally included on the soundtrack of Malhação ID, the 17th season of the long-running soap opera Malhação (broadcast from November 9, 2009 to August 20, 2010). It was released as a digital single on the iTunes Store by Deckdisc on February 10, 2010.

Track listing
 "Tudo Pode Mudar" – 3:08

Chart performance

References

1985 songs
Epic Records singles
2010 singles